Byalalu is a village in Bangalore south District in Karnataka, India. It is an hour's drive from Bangalore city, off the Bangalore-Mysore highway. The population was reported as 2,300 in the 2011 Indian census.

Indian Deep Space Network 
The Indian Space Research Organisation (ISRO) set up a Deep Space Network (DSN) centre in Byalalu. One of the main advantages of having the DSN at Byalalu was its saucer-like shape that would help in blocking radio frequency disturbances. The DSN was initially set up to track Chandrayaan I, India's first lunar mission; as of September 2014, it is being used to track the ongoing Mars Orbiter Mission (MOM), known as Mangalyaan.

References 

Villages in Bangalore Rural district